Casey Sorrow is an internationally known American cartoonist, illustrator, and printmaker.

Fetus-X 
Sorrow's early comic collaboration with Eric Millikin, Fetus-X, was run for a short time in Michigan State University's The State News in 2000. After the Catholic League protested the comic and then MSU president M. Peter McPherson declared he wanted it banned, the comic strip was removed for being too controversial. During the controversy over the comic, many people protested on both sides of the issue.

Those who were against the comic protested on religious grounds. One said, "As a born-again Christian, I just wanted to notify the writers of “Fetus-X” that the comic strip [is] very offensive. ... I pray that one day you will come to know the power of the cross." Another warned, "Do you remember what happened when they said, 'not even God can sink the Titanic?' There are certain things you just don’t joke about. ... keep your blasphemy to yourself."

Those in favor of the comic said that "I would not hesitate to liken 'Fetus-X' to the Black Sabbath of comic strips ... It is the courage, imagination and talent of both the band and the strip that will set them apart from the other flavors of the week and earn them both places in artistic history." And: "It's frustrating to see the ultimate goal of political correctness gain precedence over the basic principle that Casey Sorrow and Eric Millikin have the artistic right to their own opinions."

The comic was also published in other student newspapers like the University Reporter.

The Cats of Copenhagen 
In 2012, Sorrow illustrated the first printed edition  of James Joyce's The Cats of Copenhagen, where Sorrow's pen and ink hand-drawings were made into clichés typographiques and printed on a rare American-built Vandercook SP 33 proofing press for the first edition. In October 2012, Simon & Schuster published the first U.S. edition through Scribner.  As of 2014, Sorrow's illustrations have been featured in 8 different international language editions, including an Italian version published by Psichogios Publications, a Greek version be Giunti Editore, a Danish version by Gyldendal, and a Chinese version by Chein Hsing Publishing. American fashion magazine Vogue described The Cats of Copenhagen as "charmingly illustrated" and a perfect gift for anarchists.

Finn's Hotel
In 2013, Sorrow's illustrations were again featured in first printing of a James Joyce book, Finn's Hotel published by Ithys Press.  Sorrow's illustrations are also featured in the international editions in Spanish by Editorial Losada, Italian by Gallucci, Greek by Psichogios Publications, Portuguese by Compahnia das Letras, and German by Suhrkamp Verlag.  The illustrations for Finn's Hotel have been described as fun and relevant with a child's naivety.

Bestiary of Fantastic Creatures
In January 2014, Sorrow successfully funded a Kickstarter for an OSR style RPG bestiary of monsters, "Bestiary of Fantastic Creatures Volume 1: Bizarre Monsters", written and illustrated by Sorrow.  The book is described by Sorrow's publishing house, Bull Cock Press, as "a small collection of uniquely illustrated creatures produced to be compatible with the format of traditional table-top role-playing games playable with paper and pencil".  It was released to the general public in June 2014, in both a physical and PDF format.  Reviews describe the bestiary as "awesomely illustrated" with creatures that "feel fun, and look epic",  "an old school monster manual from the times when monsters still were imaginative and the art was personal and cool", and a little volume of strange monsters that not only is "Fiend Folio-good, it's Fiend Factory good".

Other works
Sorrow's illustrations have appeared in publications like The New York Times.

Sorrow is also known as the creator of December 14's unofficial holiday, Monkey Day.

Sorrow attended art school at Michigan State University, where his artwork often focused on screen prints of flaming skulls.

References

External links 
 Official website

American cartoonists
Living people
Michigan State University alumni
Artists from Lansing, Michigan
Place of birth missing (living people)
Year of birth missing (living people)